Eduard Karplus (September 7, 1899 – August ?, 1979) was an Austrian-born engineer, best known as the inventor of the Variac.

Karplus was born in Hinterbrühl, the second child of Johann Paul Karplus, a neurophysiologist and psychiatrist, and Valerie von Lieben, 
a sister of physicist Robert von Lieben.  
He had three brothers, Johann (Hans) Karplus (father of 2013 Nobel Laureate in Chemistry, Martin Karplus), 
Walter Gottlieb Karplus and Heinrich Karplus.

Eduard attended Gymnasium Stubenbastei in Vienna, completing with Matura in 1918, and graduated as "Diplomingenieur" from the Electrical Engineering department
of the Vienna University of Technology in 1923.

From 1923 to 1929, he was employed in the radio frequency laboratories of the C. Lorenz AG, Berlin, Germany, 
where he worked on mobile high-frequency communication equipment.

In 1930, Eduard Karplus joined the engineering staff of General Radio Corporation in Cambridge, Massachusetts,
where he designed and developed measuring instruments, including work on early models of oscilloscopes.

Karplus' best-known invention is the development of the first practical, continuously adjustable variable-ratio autotransformer, 
which General Radio introduced under the "Variac" brand name (short for "variable AC") in 1933.
In the 1940s and 1950, he continued to work on microwave topics such as signal generators, 
including the design of the GR connector.

He was a member of the American Institute of Electrical Engineers and a Fellow of the Institute of Radio Engineers (since 1938)
.

Personal life

Karplus was married to Harriet Green (1909-2004).  He died in Belmont, Massachusetts, in August 1979.

Publications and patents

 (1927)
 (1928)
 (1928)
 (1928)
 (1929)
 (1929)
 (1929)
 (1934 - the variac patent)
 (1941)
 (1945)

References

1899 births
1979 deaths
Austrian Jews
American electrical engineers
Austrian electrical engineers
20th-century American engineers
Austrian emigrants to the United States